Oleg Lebedev may refer to:

 Oleg Lebedev (basketball) (born 1971), Russian basketball player 
 Oleg Lebedev (politician, born 1964), Russian politician
 Oleg Lebedev (politician, born 1976), Russian politician